Violated is a European-only EP released by rap metal band Stuck Mojo. The album was released as a means of promoting the band for its first ever tour overseas in Europe. The EP includes a cover of Black Sabbath's "Sweet Leaf", as well as two live songs.

Track listing 
 Violated - 3:11
 U.B.Otch - 4:42 (an early version of "Back in the Saddle")
 Sweet Leaf - 3:54
 Pizza Man - 2:15
 F.O.D. [live] - 4:10
 Monster [live] - 3:51

References

1996 EPs
Stuck Mojo albums
Century Media Records EPs
Albums produced by Andy Sneap